
Reville or Réville may refer to:

Places
 Réville, a commune in the Manche department in Normandy in northwestern France
 Réville-aux-Bois, a commune in the Meuse department in Lorraine in north-eastern France

French surname
 Albert Réville (1826-1906), French Protestant theologian
 Jean Réville (1854-1908), French Protestant theologian, son of the above
  (1883–1949), French politician

English surname
 Alma Reville (1899-1982), Lady Hitchcock
 David Reville (born 1943), Canadian politician
 Paul Reville, American educator and politician
 Peter Reville (1904–1970), Aussie rules footballer
 Stephen Reville (1844–1916), Australian Catholic bishop

See also
 Revill
 Reveille (disambiguation)